The 1989 Gator Bowl was held on December 30, 1989, at the Gator Bowl Stadium in Jacksonville, Florida.  The 14th-ranked Clemson Tigers defeated the 17th-ranked West Virginia Mountaineers by a score of 27–7. For sponsorship reasons, the game was officially known as the Mazda Gator Bowl.

Game summary

The scoring was opened by West Virginia in the first quarter, as they scored on a 12-yard pass. The PAT was good and the Mountaineers led 7–0. Clemson retaliated in the second quarter, though, as they converted a 27-yard field goal and then a 1-yard touchdown run. The Tigers led at halftime, 10–7. The third quarter saw no scoring, and the fourth quarter's scoring was opened by Clemson, as they scored on a 4-yard rush to lead 17–7. The Tigers defense got them six more, as they recovered a fumble in the end zone to score yet another touchdown. The extra point was successfully converted, and the Tigers took a 24–7 lead. Clemson topped their victory off with a 24-yard field goal, and they won the game, 27–7.

Aftermath
The Tigers finished the game with eight more first downs, 139 more rushing yards, and 111 more total yards. WVU finished with 28 more passing yards.

As a result of their victory, Clemson rose from their #14 spot to finish at #12 for the 1989 season. The Mountaineers dropped from #17 to #21.

References

Gator Bowl
Gator Bowl
Clemson Tigers football bowl games
West Virginia Mountaineers football bowl games
December 1989 sports events in the United States
1989 in sports in Florida